Creative city  is an urban planning concept.

Creative City or Creative Cities may refer to:

Creative City, Emirati economic zone
Chiang Mai Creative City, A Thailand project
Creative Cities, an international project designed and managed by the British Council
Creative Cities Network, a project under the patronage of UNESCO
The Creative City, a 1995 book by Charles Landry, influential for the "creative city" concept

See also
Creative economy (economic system)